TSS Amsterdam was a passenger vessel built for the British Railways in 1950.

History

The ship was built by John Brown on Clydebank and launched on 19 January 1950. After a career as a passenger ferry for British Railways she was converted as a cruise ship for Chandris Line and renamed Fiorita. She sank in a storm in waters near Turkey and was later raised and used from 1973 as an accommodation ship.  In 1980 she was renamed Ariane II. She capsized and sank in a storm at Fethiye, Turkey, on 27 January 1987.

References

1950 ships
Steamships of the United Kingdom
Ships built on the River Clyde
Ships of British Rail